Carl Waagen (1800 – 26 November 1873 in Munich) was a German painter and lithographer.

Life 
Born in Hambourg, Waagen was the son of the painter Friedrich Ludwig Heinrich Waagen (1750-1825) and his wife Johanna Louise Alberti († 1807), his elder brother was the art scholar Gustav Friedrich Waagen (1794-1868). He studied at the Hochschule für Bildende Künste Dresden and the Academy of Fine Arts, Prague, and he learned fresco painting at the Akademie der Bildenden Künste München from 1820. In Breslau, Waagen worked as a portrait painter and then for two years as a restorer at the Berlin Museum. After a stay in Rome from 1827 to 1828, he settled in Munich.

He made portraits (oil paintings and miniatures), landscapes and history paintings as well as lithographs, among others with the portrait of the emperor Pedro I of Brazil.

On 17 October 1831, he married the singer Nanette Schechner (1806-1860), of whom he also made a lithograph. Their sons were the ennobled Maj. Gen.  (1832–1906), the painter Adalbert Waagen (1833–1898) as well as the geologist Wilhelm Heinrich Waagen (1841–1900).

References

Further reading 
 Hyacinth Holland: Waagen, Karl. In Allgemeine Deutsche Biographie (ADB). vol. 54, Leipzig 1908, S. 780 f.
 Waagen, Carl. In Hans Vollmer (ed.): Allgemeines Lexikon der Bildenden Künstler von der Antike bis zur Gegenwart. Founded by Ulrich Thieme and Felix Becker. Vol. 35: Waage–Wilhelmson. E. A. Seemann, Leipzig 1942, .

External links 
 Carl Waagen at Deutsche Digitale Bibliothek

19th-century German painters
19th-century German male artists
German lithographers
1800 births
1873 deaths
Artists from Hamburg